Sara Errani and Bibiane Schoofs were the defending champions, but Errani was unable to participate due to her doping suspension. Schoofs played alongside Desirae Krawczyk, but lost in the first round to Han Xinyun and Darija Jurak.

Eugenie Bouchard and Sofia Kenin won the title, defeating Paige Mary Hourigan and Taylor Townsend in the final, 1–6, 6–1, [10–7].

Seeds

Draw

Draw

External links
 Main draw

ASB Classic - Doubles
WTA Auckland Open